List of cultural heritage landmarks of national significance in Dnipropetrovsk Oblast.

Listings

References
 Rada.gov.ua: Objects of cultural heritage of national significance in the State Registry of Immobile Landmarks of Ukraine — 2009 Resolution of Cabinet of Ministers of Ukraine.

.
.
.cultural heritage landmarks
History of Dnipropetrovsk Oblast
Tourism in Dnipropetrovsk Oblast
Dnipropetrovsk Oblast